Bangladesh Basketball Federation is the national organization for basketball and is responsible for governing the sport in Bangladesh. Mostafa Jalal Mohiuddin is president and Abhijit Sarker is the general secretary. of the federation.

History
Bangladesh Basketball Federation was established in 1972 under the National Sports Council. It is an associate member of FIBA (Fédération Internationale de Basketball Amateur). The federation owns the Dhanmondi Wooden Floor Gymnasium, the only active basketball gymnasium in Bangladesh. It is set to lose the ground to the proposed Sheikh Kamal Sports Complex.

Bangladesh Olympics Association suspended Sabuj Miah, national women's basketball team coach, over allegations him assaulting a female player in November 2019.

References

Basketball in Bangladesh
National members of FIBA
Basketball governing bodies in Asia
1972 establishments in Bangladesh
Sports organizations established in 1972
Basketball
Organisations based in Dhaka